Peter Croft (born 1950) is a British former sports shooter.

Sports shooting career
Croft represented Great Britain at the 1984 Summer Olympics.

He represented England and won a bronze medal in the clay pigeon trap and a silver medal in the trap pairs with Peter Boden, at the 1982 Commonwealth Games in Brisbane, Queensland, Australia. Eight years later he represented Scotland in the individual and pairs trap event, at the 1990 Commonwealth Games in Auckland, New Zealand. Croft also won the 1980 Individual Trap European Shotgun Championships.He also won a Bronze Medal in the 1993 European Championships. He won the Grand Prix of Nations (Olympic Trap) in 1982 and 1983 and won the World Championship (Grand Mondial) in Universal Trap in 1982 as well as a Silver medal in the same event in 1980.

References

1950 births
Living people
British male sport shooters
Olympic shooters of Great Britain
Shooters at the 1984 Summer Olympics
Shooters at the 1982 Commonwealth Games
Shooters at the 1990 Commonwealth Games
Commonwealth Games medallists in shooting
Commonwealth Games silver medallists for England
Commonwealth Games bronze medallists for England
Medallists at the 1982 Commonwealth Games